The EBow, short for electronic bow or energy bow, is an electronic device used for playing string instruments, most often the electric guitar. It is manufactured by Heet Sound Products, of Los Angeles, California. It was invented by Greg Heet in 1969, introduced in 1976 and patented in 1978.

The EBow uses a pickup in an inductive string driver feedback circuit, including a sensor coil, driver coil and amplifier, to induce forced string vibrations. The EBow is monophonic, and drives one string at a time, producing a sound reminiscent of using a bow on the strings.

History
In 1976, Heet Sound introduced the first EBow at the NAMM Show. It featured an internal, string vibration triggered automatic power switch, a chromium-plated ABS plastic shell, a red LED power indicator, and a police-style form fitted black leather holster, embossed with the EBow logotype. In later years, five subsequent EBow models were introduced, all of which consisted of internal variations of the original EBow circuit and actuator coils, as well as color changes to the original plastic shell and EBow logotype, both of which have remained essentially unaltered since the introduction of the EBow, with the exception of the addition of an external power switch on the back. The latest EBow model is the "Plus EBow", which is switchable between "standard mode" and "harmonic mode".

Since the 1990s, various manufacturers have introduced string drivers for guitar and bass, including hand-held monophonic and polyphonic string drivers, as well as built-in and surface mounted types. All polyphonic models are produced under the SRG brand. Commonly referred to as "Resonators", and monophonic "Sustainers" such as Fernandes Guitars (G-401), Sustainiac (Stealth Pro3), and "gooseneck" microphone stand mounted types (Vibesware Guitar Resonators).

Function and use
The EBow is used to produce a variety of sounds not playable on a guitar using traditional strumming or picking techniques. These sounds are created by a string driver that gets its input signal by an internal pickup, which works like a guitar pickup. Its output signal is amplified and drives the other coil, which amplifies the string vibrations. With this feedback loop the player can create a continuous string vibration. Fading in and out by lowering and raising the EBow is also possible.

Starting with the current generation of EBow (PlusEBow, the 4th edition EBow), the user also gains an additional mode known as harmonic mode, which produces a higher harmonic sound instead of the fundamental note. This is achieved by reversing the signal phase to the driving coil, which damps the string's fundamental frequency and creates higher harmonics.

Style range
Many different artists have used the EBow in a wide variety of musical styles. One of the first notable users was Genesis guitarist Steve Hackett, who used the device on "Carpet Crawlers" from the band's 1974 album The Lamb Lies Down on Broadway.  Another early pioneer of EBow playing was Chris Stein of Blondie.

It was used later on by Bill Nelson, who introduced it to Stuart Adamson of The Skids. Adamson went on to use it with Big Country, specifically on the albums The Crossing, Steeltown, The Seer and Peace in Our Time. The EBow was a major contributor to the band's sound being labelled with the bagpipe tag, much to the frustration of guitarist Bruce Watson, who would also occasionally utilize the EBow. The EBow was utilized by Pink Floyd guitarist David Gilmour on the introduction to "Take it Back" on The Division Bell. In this case, it is possible that the sound produced stems from miking an un-amplified electric guitar, rather than from the more conventional amplified usage.

The EBow was used by Blue Öyster Cult lead guitarist Donald (Buck Dharma) Roeser, on their 1976 song, "(Don't Fear) The Reaper", to segue the middle instrumental lead break back into the final verse of the song. The device was used again on the follow-up album, Spectres, on at least one track ("Celestial the Queen").

The EBow is used by the Radiohead guitarist Ed O'Brien for performances of songs such as "My Iron Lung", "Talk Show Host", "Jigsaw Falling Into Place", "Where I End and You Begin" and "Nude".

R.E.M. references the EBow in the song title of "E-Bow the Letter", the lead single from their 1996 album New Adventures in Hi-Fi, with guitarist Peter Buck using one throughout the song.

It has also been used on Opeth's 2001 album Blackwater Park, to create ambient background melodies. Blondie has used it on several songs including "Fade Away and Radiate" and "Cautious Lip".

In the 1980s The Bongos used the EBow in the intro of their song "Numbers With Wings" and also in "River To River", "Miss Jean", "Glow", "Flew A Falcon" and "Sweet Blue Cage". Frontman Richard Barone continues to use an EBow on his subsequent solo recordings and much of his production work including his songs "Love is a Wind that Screams" and his cover of T. Rex's "The Visit".

The Church used the EBow in the song Under the Milky Way featuring a 12-string acoustic guitar melody along with a solo composed with an EBow on a Fender Jazzmaster, and recorded on a Synclavier, leading to a sound reminiscent of bagpipes.

It has been used by Daniel Ash from Bauhaus, Tones On Tail, and Love and Rockets. "One thing that changed everything for me to my advantage was discovering the e-bow. A lot of people think it's keyboards on various songs, but it's actually e-bow which basically turns the guitar into a keyboard cos' it just sustains on the one note. Seventh Dream of Teenage Heaven and Burning Skies are probably good examples of that. As soon as I saw that thing on the shelf I just had to have it and it changed everything for me. It completely opened up the sound of the guitar. It was very inspirational for me to get hold of that little gizmo."

Besides its appearance in rock and jazz music, the EBow also made its way in the domain of contemporary art music, being used by John Cage in his harp piece A Postcard from Heaven (1982), Karlheinz Essl in Sequitur VIII (2008) for electric guitar and live-electronics, Elliott Sharp on SFERICS (1996), Arnold Dreyblatt in E-Bow Blues (1998) and David First in A Bet on Transcendence Favors the House (2008).

Alternative use
Although the EBow is most commonly played on the electric guitar, because of its ease of use and the responsiveness obtainable from the pickup, many artists have experimented with the EBow on other types of guitars and string instruments to various effect. While the EBow is not normally used with the electric bass guitar, which has heavier strings, Michael Manring (who uses light bass strings) uses it on his 1995 album Thönk. He has also been known to use two at once. Another instrument that the EBow is sometimes used on is the steel-string acoustic guitar. For example, guitarist David Gilmour of Pink Floyd used one on his Gibson J-200 acoustic in their 1994 song "Take It Back". Generally an acoustic guitar gives a limited response for varying reasons, including the density and spacing of the guitar strings. But despite these limitations, using an EBow on an acoustic guitar gives a rich, flute- and clarinet-like tone with a slow-swelling response.

Composer Luciano Chessa employs EBows regularly in his music for solo Vietnamese đàn bầu. Furthermore, an EBow can also be utilised on a grand piano (with depressed sustain pedal) to create sustained sinusoidal sounds as it was used by Cor Fuhler in De Lamp, de Knijper en het Molentje (1991) and the brazilian composer Marcus Siqueira wrote "Cataclisma" - Kατακλυσμός (2015) - for solo piano using one Ebow  Olga Neuwirth in Hooloomooloo (1997) and Karlheinz Essl in Sequitur XIII (2009) for extended piano and live-electronics.

Other notable users

This is a partial list of only notable performers who have used an EBow in at least three of their songs and who were not mentioned in the text above.
 Guitarist Phil Keaggy has used an EBow extensively since the 1970s.
 Broadway orchestrator William David Brohn, used to extensive effect in the orchestrations for the musicals Wicked and Mary Poppins.
 Jonny Buckland from Coldplay used it in the songs "Amsterdam", "Spies", "See You Soon", "Princess of China", "Oceans", and “Coloratura”.
 Billy Corgan and James Iha of The Smashing Pumpkins, used on the songs "Thru the Eyes of Ruby", "Sinfony", "Soma", "Drown", "Perfect", "Daphne Descends", "Stand Inside Your Love", "Speed Kills" as well as in many live versions of songs.
 Wayne Hussey, used extensively throughout his recorded output with both The Mission and The Sisters of Mercy, the songs "Wasteland" and "Marian" being two prime examples. Also known to have used it on acoustic guitars and electric 12 strings.   
 The Edge of U2, on the studio and live versions of "The Unforgettable Fire". During the Joshua Tree and Lovetown tours, he used it on their hit song "With or Without You", replacing the Infinite Guitar used on the original studio recording. He has also used guitars with "sustainer" pickups and effects in live performances.
 Ty Tabor of King's X uses the chrome EBow extensively live and throughout the band's catalog, notably on songs such as "A Box", "Cigarettes", "Legal Kill", "The Burning Down", "Not Just for the Dead", "Jenny", "Sooner Or Later" and the psychedelic intro to "In The New Age".
 Paul Reynolds, formerly of A Flock of Seagulls, used it extensively with A Flock of Seagulls, most noticeably on "Wishing (If I Had a Photograph of You)".
 Steve Rothery of Marillion, in a number of tracks, including on the 1985 UK Number One album Misplaced Childhood, the song "The King of Sunset Town" and the ending part of "Seasons End", both from the 1989 Seasons End album, and also throughout the song "You're Gone" from the 2004 Marbles album.
 Rob Dean of Japan used it on Quiet Life and Gentlemen Take Polaroids.
 John Haughm of Agalloch, on the songs "Odal", "Limbs" "Sowilo Rune", and "Faustian Echoes".
 Guitarist John Ellis has used the EBow frequently. Some of his performances include the extensive EBow-aided guitar parts on the Judge Smith album Curly's Airships and on his own 2013 album Sly Guitar.
 Vinnie Moore, in the songs "Rain", "The Maze", "In the Healing Garden", "Fear and Trepidation", "Over My Head", and "Into the Sunset" in the studios and during live performances.
 Paul Stanley of KISS, on his first solo album, Paul Stanley, in 1978.
 John Petrucci, on the Dream Theater song "Space-Dye Vest" from the album Awake. He has also used it on the tracks "Finally Free", "Disappear", and "The Ministry of Lost Souls".
 Eddie Vedder, in the Pearl Jam songs "Wishlist", "Rearviewmirror", and "World Wide Suicide".
 Munaf Rayani of the post-rock band Explosions in the Sky in various songs, including "The Moon Is Down", "Memorial" and "Be Comfortable, Creature".
 Brad Delson of Linkin Park, on the song “No More Sorrow” from Minutes to Midnight (Linkin Park album).
 Wes Borland of Limp Bizkit, on songs like "Hold on" for ambience and manipulated the feedback in the intro of "Boiler" with it, and on the songs "Song for Clay", "Uniform" and "Biko".
 Peter Buck of R.E.M., on several songs, including "Walk Unafraid" from the album Up, and "E-Bow the Letter" from the album New Adventures in Hi-Fi.
 Georg Hólm of Sigur Rós, in various songs, including "Untitled #6" from the  album.
 Peter Holmström of The Dandy Warhols, in multiple songs, including on a Fender Bass VI on "Godless", and as a guest musician for Daydream Machine on their song "Twin Idols".
 Brody Uttley of Rivers of Nihil, in various songs, namely on "Suntold" and "Death Is Real".
 Guitarists Wata and Takeshi of the Japanese band Boris use e-bows on various recordings and in concert.
 Troy Donockley of the symphonic metal band Nightwish has used EBows live to imitate the violin solos from songs such as "While Your Lips Are Still Red" and " The Greatest Show on Earth".
Noel Gallagher of Oasis used the e-bow on "Don't Look Back in Anger" and "Champagne Supernova" on the album, What's The Story (Morning Glory).
 Michael Belfer of Black Lab used the e-bow on "Time Ago", "Anything" and "Ten Million Years" on the album Your Body Above Me.
 Todd Rundgren used the Ebow on Roger Powell's track "Morning Chorus" from Powell's album, Air Pocket.

References

External links
 EBow website
 EBow Technical Analysis
 EBow entry on Wikibooks

Guitar parts and accessories
Effects units